Pretty Addicted is an English electronic music group formed in London, England, in 2011. The project is the brainchild of Vicious Precious with a live band and a live drummer.

History
The band was started in late 2011 by Vicious Precious.

Musical style and image
The band has been described as a mix of electronic music, electropunk and trance, although the band principally describe themselves as "dance punk". They are influenced by a wide range of music, with Vicious describing their main influences as Marilyn Manson and The Prodigy.

Member
Current
 Vicious Precious - vocals, live performance (2010–present)

Discography

Albums
It All Stems from Childhood (2014, self-release)
Holding Hands The Shadow Flan (2016, self-release)
The Magic of A Lunatic (2017, self-release)
Soul for Sale (2021. self-release)

References

Musical groups from London
Musical groups established in 2011
English gothic rock groups
English electronic music groups
2011 establishments in England